Sir Stanley Harrington, PC (15 May 1856 – 31 July 1949) was an Irish industrialist who played a prominent part in the economic development of Cork.

References

Knights Bachelor
People from Cork (city)
1856 births
1949 deaths
Place of birth missing
Place of death missing